Robert "Bob" Ansett (born 8 August 1933 in Melbourne) is an Australian entrepreneur, actor, author, motivational speaker and former sports team chairman.

Early life
Ansett is the son of Reg (Order of the British Empire) and Grace Ansett. Reg Ansett was the owner of various businesses, including Ansett Transport Industries, Diners Club Australia, Ansett Australia Airlines and, much later, Avis Australia.

Bob Ansett's parents divorced when Bob was 7–8 years old, in 1941. Bob, his mother Grace and brother John soon moved to the United States. Ansett grew in the United States' state of Alaska; he has claimed that during the 20 years he lived in the States, he saw his father no more than five times; their relationship was seemingly severed by the distance of their residence places; Ansett also said that he never visited his father's Mount Eliza, Victoria home or met his three stepsisters. In 1955, he was drafted by the United States Army and served in Japan. In North America, Ansett attended the University of Utah with an American Football scholarship.

Budget Rent a Car
By 1965, Ansett was having financial difficulties in the United States.

At the same time, the car rental industry in Australia was booming. Both federal and state governments in Australia took on a protective stand towards public-owned companies by not allowing competition to block Australian public-owned companies' growth opportunities.

The lion's share of the Australian car rental industry's business belonged to Avis Australia, which would later belong to Bob Ansett's father Reg. Avis Australia had government contacts and also contracts with Qantas and with Reg Ansett's airline, Ansett Australian Airlines, which allowed the company to be the sole licensed car rentals operator at Australia's 56 major airports. With that in mind, Bob Ansett decided to return to Australia. Ansett was in need of a job so he asked his father for one but was denied. Ansett then reunited a bit of capital and became licensed to use the name of Budget Rent a Car, the American car rental company, in Australia. That meant that, in essence, when Reg Ansett bought Avis Australia in 1977, father and son became direct competitors. Bob Ansett opened the first Budget Australian location in 1965.

By the early 1980s, Ansett was known to Australians as Budget Australia's owner; he appeared on commercials promoting the brand, and was known as a caring individual who sometimes showed up himself at Budget locations and attended to the customers himself. Budget had overcome, among others, his father Reg Ansett's Avis operation and become the leading car rental company in Australia under Bob Ansett's leadership. But financial troubles loomed ahead for the company, and several financial advisors cast their doubts about Ansett's capabilities as a company president. In addition to that, Ansett did not maximize Budget's profits when the company had become the leading car rental company in Australia, because he did not consider profits as a priority. There was also a financial dispute between Budget and Citibank during that era, and the Ford Motor Company decided to stop shipping cars to Budget, which compounded the Australian car rental company's financial crisis of the time.

In 1990, Ansett declared himself bankrupt, as he owed $65,000,000 Australian dollars to debtors.

Acting career
Ansett was a popular and well liked figure in Australia. His participation in Budget commercials allowed him to launch a secondary career as an actor. He played himself in the 1980 short film "Alive and Kicking", then he played his dad Reg in the 1991 biopic television mini-series, "Rose Against the Odds", about Australian world boxing champion Lionel Rose. That mini-series had a theatrical release, as a feature film, during 1995.

Ansett also appeared in the reality series, Australian Story, during 1996.

Sports team owner
Ansett was the President, until 1991, of the Australian rules football team, the North Melbourne Football Club, a member of the AFL.

Motivational speaker
Ansett is a motivational speaker. He works for several motivational-speaker contracting companies.

Writings
Ansett has written two books: 1986's "Ansett: an Autobiography", and "The Customer".

Personal life
Ansett married Josephine Ansett (née Chadwick) on 1 January 1975. They have been married since and have 3 children.

The Ansetts reside in Noosa, Queensland. In 1992, the Ansetts faced an eviction from their home, because of a federal court action brought over by Bob Ansett's bankruptcy trustee. After a 5-year court battle, it was decided, on 28 March 1998, that the Ansetts would keep their home.

Health problems
Ansett has faced some health issues as an older man: An avid marathon runner who still ran well into his eighties, Ansett needed a hip replacement in his early seventies because of a fall during a jogging session.

He also had cancer, in his case, a melanoma. He is, as of 2022, cancer-free.

References 

1933 births
Living people
Australian actors
Australian businesspeople
Australian writers
People from Melbourne
University of Utah alumni
United States Army soldiers